Georges Conan (born 1913) was a French cyclist. He competed in the individual road race event at the 1932 Summer Olympics. He also rode in the 1936 Tour de France.

References

External links
 

1913 births
Year of death missing
French male cyclists
Olympic cyclists of France
Cyclists at the 1932 Summer Olympics
Cyclists from Paris